Telecentre.org Academy is a movement in Sri Lanka, whose sole purpose is to uplift the standards and professionalism of telecentre workers.

The telecentre.org Academy is an initiative to provide telecentre managers with ongoing training, capacity building, and professional development opportunities. Structured as a consortium of national academies and partners with a small global support unit, the academy supports and coordinates training programs, promotes the collaborative development and sharing of resources, and maintains accreditation and certification standards.

Steering  Committee

See also
 Nenasala

References

External links
  Telecentre.org

Science and technology in Sri Lanka